Mightyfools were a Dutch DJ, rapper and production duo formed in 2008, comprising Jelle Keizer and Andy Samin. The duo had three successful productions in 2013: "Footrocker", "Put Em Up" and "Go", respectively released through Revealed Recordings, DOORN Records and Wall Recordings. The project was discontinued in 2018, shortly after Andy Samin left the project in the winter of 2017 due to problems connected with depression. After the retirement, Keizer was appointed the A&R of Barong Family.

Keizer has continued his career as DJ and house producer under his own name since June 2018.

On the 31st of december 2022, Jelle Keizer shared a story of the Mightyfools stating "Hello 2023".

Achievements 

Mightyfools were supported by Laidback Luke, Don Diablo, Hardwell and Fedde Le Grand, the group occurred on major international festivals such as the Amsterdam Dance Event.

Discography

Extended plays

Other EPs

 Feel Good EP (Dim Mak, 2013)
 The Legacy EP (Klash, 2018)

Singles

Charted singles

Other singles

 2012: "Drum Fail" (with Jordy Dazz) [Hysteria Records]
 2013: "Ladykiller" [Revealed Recordings]
 2013: "Footrocker" [Revealed Recordings]
 2013: "Put Em Up" [DOORN (Spinnin')]
 2013: "Go" [Wall Recordings]
 2014: "Pullover" (with Niels Van Gogh) [DOORN (Spinnin')]
 2014: "Lick Dat"' (with Yellow Claw) [Barong Family]
 2014: "Shaolin" [Fly Eye Records]
 2015: "Garuda" [Spinnin' Records]
 2015: "Shots Fired" (with Mike Hawkins) [Fly Eye Records]
 2015: "No Class" (with Yellow Claw) [Barong Family]
 2015: "Gangsta" [Spinnin' Premium]
 2017: "Dansen" (with Bizzey) [Made in NL]
 2017: "FLOW" (with SICK INDIVIDUALS) [Armada Music]
 2018: "U Need To" [Hysteria Records]

As featured artists

 2017: Afrojack featuring Mightyfools - "Keep It Low" [Wall Recordings]

References

Notes
 A  Did not enter the Ultratop 50, but peaked on the Dance chart.

Sources

External links
Official website

Dutch DJs
Dutch house music groups
Electronic music duos
Electro house musicians
Dutch musical duos
Spinnin' Records artists
Revealed Recordings artists
Electronic dance music DJs